Faut qu'ils s'activent is the second album of Tryo. This album is less reggae because of some new instruments (accordion for example).

Personnel
Manu Evno- Guitar, Vocals
Guizmo- Guitar, Vocals
Christophe Mali- Guitar, Vocals, accordion
Daniel Bravo- Percussion

Track listing
 J'ai trouvé des amis (Guizmo) 4:44
 Le petit chose (Christophe Mali) 2:58
 Con par raison (Guizmo) 4:07
 Plus on en fait (Christophe Mali) 3:29
 Paris (Guizmo) 5:47
 Les extrêmes (Christophe Mali) 2:44
 Cinq sens (Guizmo) 4:46
 La mer Guizmo 3:32
 La débandade (Christophe Mali) 2:22
 Les nouveaux bergers (Guizmo) 4:38
 Le monde est avare (Guizmo) 6:47
 Ca y est c'est fait (Tryo) 2:56
 Le saule (Guizmo et Manu Eveno) 5:13
 La lumière (Tryo) 15:29

Tryo albums